Bieber is a village in Hesse, Germany, with a total population of 16,137 as of 2020. Since 1938 it has been a Stadtteil of Offenbach am Main.

Geography 
A small river, a tributary of the Rodau called Bieber flows through the village.

At the top of the hill Bieberer Berg (elevation 120 m above NHN) stands the soccer-stadium Sparda Bank Hessen Stadion, formerly the Stadion Bieberer Berg, home of the soccer team Kickers Offenbach.

History 
The village's name is derived from the Celtic people. Bieber as such was first mentioned in 791 as Biberaha in a donation.

Into the 19th century, Bieber's population was Roman Catholic. Now there is the catholic parish St. Nikolaus and a Protestant parish.

In 1938, the former municipality Bieber was merged with Offenbach.

Infrastructure

Transport
Bieber is part of the S-Bahn Rhein-Main-System with two S-Bahn stations: Offenbach-Bieber station is near the centre of the village and the other is in the borough of Bieber-Waldhof (3,500 Inhabitants in 2005).

External links

Municipal website of Offenbach, Stadtteil Bieber (German)
Arms of Bieber

References

Bieber